Shayad is a 2017 Pakistani drama serial directed by Bashar Momin director Syed Ali Raza Usama, produced by Babar Javed and written by Faiza Iftikhar, based on her novel of same name. The drama stars Uzair Jaswal, Sadia Khan and Noman Ijaz in lead roles, and premiered on 4 November 2017 on Geo Entertainment. It was the second serial of singer turned actor Uzair Jaswal after Moray Saiyaan.

Synopsis
There is always some madness in love. But there is also always some reason in madness. Sometime in life, an unusual situation happens, where a younger boy falls in a love of a girl who is older than him. Drama serial "Shayad" depicts the story of a one sided lover Saad, who has developed some feelings for Umm-e-Hani. She is an orphan girl and lives with Saad and his parents.

Umm-e-Hani has lost the shelter of parents in earlier age, and she is always in search of secure hands, a responsible man who can help in overcoming her insecurities and fulfilled her wishes which she wasn't able to convert into reality. She always considers Saad as an emotional, immature and boyish person and one day she finally meets a strong, influential and a man of her dream, Salaar.

Unfortunately not every beast is kind towards beauty, and Umm-e-Hani's sensible and long term decision takes her into a new trouble.

Will Saad's craziness and unconditional love towards Umm-e-Hani help him in finding her again in life?

Cast
Uzair Jaswal as Saad
Sadia Khan as Umm-e-Hani (Hani)
Noman Ijaz as Salaar
Munazzah Arif as Naila
Mohsin Gilani as Rizwan
Irfan Khoosat as Dada
Azra Aftab as Saalar Mother
Haseeb Khan as Aslam
Hareeb Farooque as Junaid
Sofia Ahmed as Mahparha
Farhana Maqsood as Salma
Kinza Razzak as Taniya
Wasim Haider as Sheharyar
Saba Shahid as Anila
Ali Mirza as Shoaib
Samina Butt as Khala Batool

Soundtrack 
The original soundtrack of Shayad is composed by Syed Adeel Ali while the lyrics are provided by Ayub Khawar. The vocals are by Uzair Jaswal who is also the second lead actor of this drama serial. The song is available on Patari.

References

Pakistani drama television series
Urdu-language television shows
2017 Pakistani television series debuts
2018 Pakistani television series endings
Pakistani television dramas based on novels